The 1920 Vermont gubernatorial election took place on November 2, 1920. Incumbent Republican Percival W. Clement, per the "Mountain Rule", did not run for re-election to a second term as Governor of Vermont. Republican candidate James Hartness defeated Democratic candidate Fred C. Martin to succeed him.

Republican primary

Results

Democratic primary

Results

General election

Results

References

Vermont
1920
Gubernatorial
November 1920 events in the United States